This is a list of fictional characters that have been explicitly described within the work in which they appear, or otherwise by the author, as being on the autism spectrum. It is not intended to include speculation. Autistic people involved in the work may be mentioned in footnotes.

Comics

Film

Literature

Television

Theater

Toys

Video games

See also
 Autism spectrum disorders in the media
 List of films about autism
 Autism and LGBT identities
 List of fictional characters with disabilities

Notes

References

Autism